Ren Lei (born 22 January 1982) is a Chinese basketball player who competed in the 2004 Summer Olympics.

References

1982 births
Living people
Basketball players from Henan
Chinese women's basketball players
Olympic basketball players of China
Basketball players at the 2004 Summer Olympics
People from Zhengzhou
Asian Games medalists in basketball
Basketball players at the 2002 Asian Games
Basketball players at the 2006 Asian Games
Asian Games gold medalists for China
Medalists at the 2002 Asian Games
Medalists at the 2006 Asian Games
Bayi Kylin players